A Belfast Story is a 2013 Irish crime film written and directed by Nathan Todd and starring Colm Meaney.  It is Todd's directorial debut.

Plot
A BELFAST STORY explores life after terrorism. Set in a city which has weathered hundreds of years of hatred, 30 years of bombs, and a war without winners, just victims. A new era brings new risks. There is peace, but that can also be deadly

Cast
Colm Meaney as Detective
Malcolm Sinclair as Chief Constable
Maggie Cronin as Sinead
Tommy O'Neill as First Minister Owen McKenna
Damien Hasson as Damien
Patrick Rocks as Eammon
Peter O'Toole as Alley victim

Reception
The film received negative reviews and has a 14% "Rotten" rating on Rotten Tomatoes.

Stephen Dalton of The Hollywood Reporter wrote in his review, "Nathan Todd attempts something similar in his debut feature, a murder mystery with political overtones, but his inexperience lets him down badly."  He also added, "not even [Meaney's] heavyweight gravitas can save A Belfast Story from its weak script, sluggish pacing and one-dimensional characters."

Steve Rose of The Guardian gave the film 2 stars out of 5 and wrote, "the plot scatters too many pieces about, putting the film's star off screen for long stretches."

Controversy
A month before its release, the film garnered controversy in Great Britain for the filmmakers' publicity stunt of sending a nail bomb kit to the media to promote the film.  Nathan Todd later issued an apology.

References

External links
 
 

2013 films
2013 crime films
Films scored by Nick Glennie-Smith
Films set in Belfast
Northern Irish films
2013 directorial debut films
2010s English-language films